Alvin Saunders Johnson (December 18, 1874 – June 7, 1971) was an American economist and a co-founder and first director of The New School.

Biography
Alvin Johnson was born near Homer, Nebraska. He was educated at the University of Nebraska and Columbia (Ph.D., 1902). Afterwards, he was employed in various positions at Columbia, the University of Nebraska, the University of Texas, the University of Chicago, Stanford, and at Cornell after 1913.

He was assistant editor of the Political Science Quarterly in 1902–06, and editor from 1917 of the New Republic in New York City.

He was a co-founder of The New School in New York in 1918, becoming its director in 1922. Johnson helped to save numerous central European scholars from persecution by the Nazis in the 1930s and 1940s, then brought them to a specially-created division of the New School which became known as the "University in Exile". There, among others, he worked with the antifascist intellectual Max Ascoli. He was also an editor of the massive Encyclopaedia of the Social Sciences.

He officially retired in December 1945, and died in 1971 in Upper Nyack, New York.

Major publications
Rent in Modern Economic Theory: An Essay in Distribution, 1903.
Introduction to Economics, 1909.
"Review of Hobson's Industrial System", 1911, AER.
"Review of Hobson's Science of Wealth", 1912, AER.
"Review of Böhm-Bawerk's Positive Theory of Capital", 1914, AER.
"Review of Adler's Kapitalzins und Preisbewegung", 1914, AER.
War and the Interests of Labor, 1914.
Commerce and War, 1914.
The Professor and the Petticoat, 1914 (novel).
"Review of Carver's Essays in Social Justice and Hollander's Abolition of Poverty", 1916, AER
John Stuyvesant, Ancestor, 1919.
Editor, Encyclopaedia of the Social Sciences, 1930.
"The Rising Tide of Anti-Semitism", 1939, Survey Graphic
The Clock of History, 1946.
Socialism in Western Europe, 1948.
Pioneer's Progress: An autobiography, 1952.
Essays in Social Economics, 1954.
New World for Old: A Family Migration, 1965
Introduction to Economics, 1971.

Literature
 Peter M. Rutkoff, William B. Scott: New School: a History of the New School for Social Research. New York: Free Press 1986.
 Claus-Dieter Krohn: Wissenschaft im Exil. Deutsche Sozial- und Wirtschaftswissenschaftler in den USA und die New School for Social Research, Frankfurt a.M. Campus 1987.
 Autobiography, Pioneer's Progress, published in 1952

References

External links

 
www.newschool.edu
Univ of Albany Archives
 Alvin Saunders Johnson papers (MS 615). Manuscripts and Archives, Yale University Library. 

1874 births
1971 deaths
People from Dakota County, Nebraska
Economists from New York (state)
American essayists
American male journalists
University of Nebraska–Lincoln alumni
Columbia University alumni
People from Upper Nyack, New York
American male essayists
Presidents of the American Economic Association
Commanders Crosses of the Order of Merit of the Federal Republic of Germany
Economists from Nebraska
Journal of Political Economy editors